Gómez González (died 1111) was a Spanish count and military leader. 

Gómez González may also refer to:

 Adrián Gómez González, Mexican drug trafficker
 Arely Gómez González (born 1952), Mexican politician
 Gómez González de Traba (fl. 1164–1209), Galician nobleman
 Gómez González de Manzanedo (died 1182), Castilian magnate
 José Higinio Gómez González (1932–2008), Spanish Roman Catholic bishop
 Juanito (footballer, born 1954) (Juan Gómez González, 1954–1992), Spanish footballer
 Julio Gómez González (born 1994), Mexican footballer
 Servando Ruiz-Gómez y González-Llanos (1821–1888), Spanish politician, lawyer and journalist

See also
González Gómez (disambiguation)